Penrice Academy is an age 11-16 academy school and specialist Language College in St Austell, Cornwall, England. Approximately 1,350 pupils attend the academy.

History
The school opened in 1960 as a secondary modern school, Penrice Secondary Modern School, becoming a comprehensive in the 1970s.

It gained academy status on 1 April 2011.

Curriculum
Languages taught include French and Spanish. It is also an International School having received a Gold International School Award from the British Council for a third time in 2012.  Other strengths are Creative and Digital Arts, English and Science.  The academy sends record numbers of students onto A Level Science courses.

Admissions
The academy has a teacher training programme and has achieved Teaching School status. The principal is Richard Baker, who took over in February 2016; From Mr David Parker (2005-2016).

The Academy takes students of all abilities and is open to all.

The uniform has been altered recently to a black blazer, black V-neck jumper with a gold strip around the neck, a gold and black striped tie and black trousers. The prefects wear the same uniform, but with a blue strip instead of the gold, and blue and black ties.

Academic performance
The academy achieves above-average GCSE results. In 2016 the school had a Progress 8 score of +0.17, with 77% of pupils earning A*-C grades in GCSE English and Mathematics. Like most secondary schools in Cornwall, it does not have a sixth form and students go onto either Truro College, Cornwall College or Bodmin College

The academy is currently graded "Outstanding" by Ofsted and was one of the first schools to be designated a 'Teaching School' in England.

References

http://www.penriceacademy.org/

External links
 EduBase

Academies in Cornwall
Secondary schools in Cornwall
Educational institutions established in 1960
St Austell